Schoenobius pyraustalis is a moth in the family Crambidae. It was described by George Hampson in 1919. It is found in Argentina.

The wingspan is about 22 mm. The forewings are yellowish, suffused with rufous, but the costal area is suffused with dark red brown up to the end of the cell. The hindwings are glossy white, tinged with brown, except towards the base.

References

Moths described in 1919
Schoenobiinae